Brunellia acostae is a species of plant in the Brunelliaceae family. It is native  to Ecuador, Panama, and Colombia.

References

Flora of South America
acostae
Vulnerable plants
Plants described in 1954
Taxonomy articles created by Polbot